World Bosniak Congress (WBC) is a global Bosniak organization. It was founded on 29 December 2012.

It was founded by Ferid Muhić, president of Bosniak Academy of Sciences and Arts, Mustafa Cerić, ex-reisu-l-ulema in Bosnia and Herzegovina and Muhamed Filipović, prominent Bosniak academician. The Congress has a strong presence from Sandžak, a Muslim Bosniak-majority region on the Serbia-Montenegro frontier.

WBC is determined as a part of Bosnian revival after Bosnian War for independence and ethnic cleansing.

References

Notes

Sources 

 

Ethnic organizations based in Bosnia and Herzegovina
Bosniak culture